TV Land Confidential was a documentary show which took a look at favorite film and television shows discussing the near-miss casting decisions, pilots with different cast members, and the ongoing real-life drama behind the scenes. The show was created and produced by David P. Levin and hosted by Alan Kalter.  It ran on TV Land from 2005 to 2007.

Production

TV Land Confidential went behind the scenes to talk to the stars of some of the most iconic and successful shows in American film and television history.  Each episode, the producers spoke to actors, producers, and network executives to uncover stories ranging from love on the set and health problems which altered the direction of a show to unaired pilots and near-miss casting decisions.  It also discussed show pilots which had different cast members, and the ongoing real-life drama behind the scenes.

Guest stars

Stars who appeared on the show included:

 Debbie Allen
 John Amos
 Bea Arthur
 Edward Asner
 Adrienne Barbeau
 Richard Belzer
 Tom Bosley
 Peter Boyle
 Todd Bridges
 Morgan Brittany
 Kirk Cameron
 Diana Canova
 Diahann Carroll
 David Cassidy
 Joan Collins
 Nikki Cox
 Yvonne Craig
 Bryan Cranston
 Tony Danza
 Dana Delaney
 William Devane
 Micky Dolenz
 Fran Drescher
 Patrick Duffy
 Julia Duffy
 Josh Duhamel
 Barbara Eden
 David Faustino

 Dann Florek
 Max Gail
 Beverly Garland
 Gloria Gaynor
 Larry Gelbart
 Ron Glass
 Louis Gossett Jr.
 Don Grady
 Robert Guillaume
 Jasmine Guy
 Larry Hagman
 Kadeem Hardison
 Pat Harrington, Jr.
 Jenilee Harrison
 Robert Hegyes
 Marilu Henner
 Dwayne Hickman
 Lawrence Hilton-Jacobs
 Judd Hirsch
 Davy Jones (musician)
 Cheryl Ladd
 John Landis
 Vicki Lawrence
 Chloris Leachman
 Hal Linden
 Mark Linn-Baker
 Barry Livingston
 Christopher Lloyd

 Gavin MacLeod
 Rue McClanahan
 Lee Meriwether
 Noel Neill
 Donny Osmond
 Bronson Pinchot
 Tom Poston
 Linda Purl
 John Ratzenberger
 Tanya Roberts
 Wayne Rogers
 John Schneider (screen actor)
 Sherwood Schwartz
 Larry Storch
 Alan Thicke
 Marlo Thomas
 Lea Thompson
 Charlene Tilton
 Frankie Valli
 Dick Van Patten
 Jon Voight
 Jimmie Walker
 Jaleel White
 Betty White
 Anson Williams
 Billy Dee Williams
 Tom Wopat
 Alan Young

References

TV Land original programming
2005 American television series debuts
2007 American television series endings